Nikoletta is a Danish, Finnish, German, Hungarian, Icelandic, Norwegian and Swedish feminine given name derived from the Greek Nikolaos. Notable people with this name include the following:

Nikoletta Lakos (born 1978), Hungarian chess grandmaster
Nikoletta Nagy (born 1994), Hungarian model
Nikoletta Samonas (born 1985), Ghanaian actress known as Nikki Samonas
Nikoletta Szőke (born 1978), Hungarian jazz vocalist
Nikoletta Tsagari (born 1990), Greek rhythmic gymnast

See also

Nicoletta (disambiguation)
Nikoleta (disambiguation)

References

Danish feminine given names
Finnish feminine given names
German feminine given names
Hungarian feminine given names
Icelandic feminine given names
Norwegian feminine given names
Swedish feminine given names